Michael de Adder (born May 25, 1967) is a Canadian editorial cartoonist and caricaturist.

Early life and education
Born in Moncton, he attended Riverview High School. He then graduated from Mount Allison University with a Bachelor of Fine Arts in 1991. While at Mount Allison, he began drawing cartoons for The Argosy, the school's student newspaper.

Career
De Adder began his career working for The Coast, a Halifax-based alternative weekly, drawing a popular comic strip called Walterworld which lampooned the then-current mayor of Halifax, Walter Fitzgerald.  This led to freelance jobs at The Chronicle-Herald and The Hill Times in Ottawa, Ontario.

In 2000, he began working at The Daily News of Halifax until its closure in 2008.

His work appears regularly in the National Post, Maclean's, The Chronicle-Herald and the Moncton Times & Transcript. His work is syndicated in North America through Artizans.com. He continues to be a weekly contributor to The Hill Times as well as to Canadian Metro dailies. He draws approximately ten cartoons weekly and, at over a million readers per day, is considered the most read cartoonist in Canada.

He is a past president of the Association of Canadian Editorial Cartoonists and is on the board of the Cartoonists Rights Network, International.

In June 2019, de Adder had his freelance contract with the Brunswick News terminated following his drawing of a cartoon criticising U.S. President Donald Trump's border policies. The cartoon showed President Trump playing golf and ignoring the dead, face down, drowned bodies of a Salvadoran man, Óscar Alberto Martínez Ramírez and his 23-month-old, small daughter, Angie Valeria Martinez, who had attempted to cross the Rio Grande, from Mexico, into the United States. The Brunswick News issued a statement saying that they had not been offered the cartoon and that the decision to replace de Adder with another cartoonist had been made some weeks previously.

In March 2021, de Adder was hired by The Washington Post.

Awards
He was nominated for a National Newspaper Award in 2002, 2014, 2015, 2018 and 2021. He was chosen the winner of the National Newspaper Award for Editorial Cartooning for 2020.

He won the Association of American Editorial Cartoonists' Golden Spike Award in 2006 for the best cartoon killed by an editor.
De Adder is the 2020 recipient of the Herblock Prize for editorial cartooning.

He was awarded an honorary doctorate by Mount Allison University in May 2020.

Publications

References

External links
 
 
 

1967 births
Living people
Artists from New Brunswick
Canadian editorial cartoonists
Canadian caricaturists
Canadian comics artists
Mount Allison University alumni
People from Moncton
The Washington Post people